Ingrid Steeger (born 1 April 1947) (as Ingrid Anita Stengert) is a German actress and comedian.

Life 
Steeger was born in Berlin. She works as a comedian and actress in Germany. She became famous in her role of comedy show  in the 1970s. Today Steeger lives in Munich.

Filmography

Awards 
 1975: Bravo Otto in Bronze for tv star
 1976: Bravo Otto in Silver
 1976: Goldene Kamera by TV magazine Hörzu
 1977: Bravo Otto in silver
 1978: Bravo Otto in gold
 1990: Bambi

External links 
 
 
 Ingrid Steeger: Eine Hommage (german)

References 

Living people
1947 births
German film actresses
German television actresses
20th-century German actresses
German women comedians
Actresses from Berlin